Olajumoke Akinjide (born 4 August 1959) is a Nigerian politician from Oyo State, Nigeria. She was the Minister of State for Federal Capital Territory (FCT) appointed by the former President of Nigeria, Goodluck Jonathan in July, 2011 to serve in the Cabinet of Nigeria.

Early life and family 
Olajumoke Akinjide, also known as Jumoke Akinjide, was born on 4 August 1959 in Ibadan, Ona-Ara Local Government Area of Oyo state into the family of late Legal Luminary, Pa Osuolale Abimbola Richard Akinjide, SAN.

Politics 
Between May 2001 and September 2003 she served as the Special Assistant to the President on FCT matters and later as Special Assistant to the President on G77 matters and Nigerians in Diaspora (NIDO) under the then-President Olusegun Obasanjo.

She is also a grassroots politician and was a candidate for the senate seat, Oyo Central Senatorial District on the PDP platform in 2011, the same year she was appointed minister.

Education 
Akinjide attended Maryhill Convent School, Idi-Ape, Iwo Road, Agodi, Ibadan, from 1963 to 1968, where she obtained her First School Leaving Certificate and proceeded to St Louis Grammar School, Ibadan 1969 to 1974 where she got her West African School Certificate (WASSCE).

Akinjide holds an LLB (Hons) from Kings College, London University, and Masters Degree in Law (LLM) from Harvard Law School in the United States.

She has a First Class Honours in the English Solicitors Final Examinations.

Akinjide has dual qualifications as Barrister and Solicitor of the Supreme Court of Nigeria and as a Solicitor of England and Wales.

Publications 
She has spoken at several law conferences as a guest lecturer and published papers on the following topics:

Legal Aspects of International Environmental Protection (1996)

Current Legal Issues for Gas Production and Utilisation in Nigeria (1997)

References 

Living people
1959 births
All Nigeria Peoples Party politicians
People from Oyo State
21st-century Nigerian women politicians
21st-century Nigerian politicians
Alumni of King's College London
Harvard Law School alumni